Arthur Franklin Mendes Filho (born August 7, 1993 in Cáceres) is a Brazilian swimmer.

He was at the 2011 FINA World Junior Swimming Championships, in Lima, Peru, where he won a bronze medal in the 100-metre butterfly.

At the 2015 Pan American Games in Toronto, Ontario, Canada, Mendes won the gold medal in the 4×100-metre medley relay, where he broke the Pan American Games record with a time of 3:32.68, along with Marcelo Chierighini, Felipe França Silva and Guilherme Guido. He also finished 7th in the 100 metre butterfly.

At the 2015 World Aquatics Championships in Kazan, Mendes finished 10th in the Men's 4 × 100 metre medley relay and 24th in the Men's 100 metre butterfly.

References

Brazilian male butterfly swimmers
1993 births
Living people
Sportspeople from Mato Grosso
Swimmers at the 2015 Pan American Games
Pan American Games gold medalists for Brazil
Pan American Games medalists in swimming
Medalists at the 2015 Pan American Games